University School is a boys' private school in Shaker Heights, Ohio.

University School may also refer to:

University Schools, a K–12 charter school in Greeley, Colorado
NSU University School, a school on the  Nova Southeastern University campus in Fort Lauderdale, Florida
University Academy, a pre-K–12 charter public school in Kansas City, Missouri
Kent State University School, a former K–12 laboratory school, Kent, Ohio
The University School (Tulsa, Oklahoma), a K–8 school in Tulsa, Oklahoma
University School of Jackson, a private pre-K–12 school in Jackson, Tennessee
University School of Nashville, a private K–12 school in Nashville, Tennessee
University School of Milwaukee, a private K–12 school in Milwaukee, Wisconsin

See also
University High School (disambiguation), various schools